Armenteros is a Spanish surname. Notable people with the surname include:

Alfredo "Chocolate" Armenteros (1928–2016)), Cuban trumpeter
Emiliano Armenteros (born 1986), Argentine footballer
José Armenteros (born 1992), Cuban judoka
Juan Armenteros (1928–2003), Cuban baseball player
Lázaro Armenteros (born 1999), Cuban baseball player
Rafael Armenteros (1922–2004), Spanish particle physicist
Samuel Armenteros (born 1990), Swedish footballer

Spanish-language surnames